Gay Allison (born 1953) is a Canadian poet, editor, and English teacher. She was the fiction editor of The Canadian Forum, poetry editor of Waves, founding editor of a feminist journal, Fireweed, co-editor of Landscape, and founding member of the Women's Writing Collective of Toronto. Additionally, Allison is an advisory board member of Tiger Lily, a journal by women of colour. Allison is also a full member of the League of Canadian Poets.

She was the recipient of the Poetry Award from the Federation of Women Teachers' Association of Ontario (FWTAO) in 1982 and 1986.

Early life 
Allison was born in Saskatchewan. She has since lived in Saskatoon, Edmonton, Vancouver, and Toronto.

Work 
Allison's poetry in The Unravelling, focuses on daily life "at a slow meditative pace."

Publications

Poetry 
 Life: Still. (1981)
 In the Valley of the Butterflies (1981)
 The Unravelling (1986)
 "Iron Shirt Moves" (1988)

Anthologies 
 Women and Words: The Anthology/Les femmes et les mots: Une anthologie (1984)
 Sp/Elles: Poetry by Canadian Women/Poésie de femmes canadiennes (1986)

Awards 
 Federation of Women Teachers' Association of Ontario, Poetry Award, 1982, 1986.
 Tyrone Guthrie Award, Stratford Festival, 1997.

References 

1953 births
Living people
Canadian women poets
20th-century Canadian poets
20th-century Canadian women writers